"Unlove You" is a song recorded by American country music artist Jennifer Nettles. It was released in January 2016 as the first single from her second solo studio album, Playing with Fire. Nettles co-wrote the song with Brandy Clark.

Critical reception
An uncredited Taste of Country review of the song was positive, calling it "a straight-down-the-middle country ballad with exceptional vocals" and "a reminder of just how talented of a vocalist she truly is."

Music video
The music video was directed by Trey Fanjoy and premiered in March 2016.

Chart performance
The song has sold 210,000 copies in the US as of August 2016.

Weekly charts

Year-end charts

References 

2016 songs
2016 singles
Jennifer Nettles songs
Big Machine Records singles
Songs written by Jennifer Nettles
Songs written by Brandy Clark
Song recordings produced by Dann Huff
Music videos directed by Trey Fanjoy